The Belle Vernon Bridge, also called the Speers Bridge or Speers/Belle Vernon Bridge, carries Interstate 70 across the Monongahela River from Speers east to Rostraver Township in the state of Pennsylvania. Around 1951 it replaced an earlier low-level bridge, which connected Pennsylvania Route 88 via State Street with Pennsylvania Route 906 at the I-70 east ramps, just to the south of the current bridge. The old bridge carried Legislative Route 118 and Pennsylvania Route 71 until those were moved to the new bridge when it opened.

History
The new bridge was authorized by President Truman on 22 June 1946.

Incidents
Trolley services were disrupted when a girder for the new bridge fell, severing the wires in 1951. Several people were injured by flying debris when one of the supports for the previous bridge was demolished by blasting in 1955.

See also

 List of crossings of the Monongahela River

References

External links

Photos of the old and new bridges

Through arch bridges in the United States
Interstate 70
Bridges over the Monongahela River
Bridges completed in 1951
Bridges in Washington County, Pennsylvania
Bridges in Westmoreland County, Pennsylvania
Road bridges in Pennsylvania
Bridges on the Interstate Highway System
Steel bridges in the United States